Un passo dal cielo (One step from heaven) is an Italian television series, aired in Italy on Rai 1 and Rai HD, starring Terence Hill as commander of the State Forestry Corps in the Italian village of San Candido and Enrico Ianniello as the local State Police commissioner. Starting from the fourth season Hill was replaced by Daniele Liotti.  It was the first television series produced and aired in HD on Rai HD.

Episodes

Season 1 (2011)

Season 2 (2012)

Season 3 (2015)

Season 4 (2017)

Season 5 (2019)

See also
List of Italian television series

External links
 

2011 Italian television series debuts
Mystery television series
Italian comedy television series
Italian television series
RAI original programming
Italian-language television shows
Films directed by Enrico Oldoini
2010s comedy-drama television series
2010s Italian drama television series